The following is a timeline of the history of the city of Tallinn, Estonia.

Prior to 17th century

 5,000 BCE - The sea still reaches the foot of the cliffs of Toompea
 3,000 BCE - First signs of a settlement in Tallinn.
 900 BCE - Iru settlement.

 300 CE - Iru fort built.
 1050 - Lyndanise Fort built on Toompea.
 1219
 Toompea Castle taken by forces of Valdemar II of Denmark.
 St Mary's Cathedral built by Danes.
 1227 - Town charter granted.
 1228 - Toompea Castle taken by the Livonian Knights.
 1237 - Toompea Castle returned to the Danes.
 1240 – St. Olaf's Church built.
 1265 – Town wall constructed.
 1275 – St. Nicholas' Church built (approximate date).
 1284 – Reval becomes part of Hanseatic League.
 1343
 April: Reval besieged by Estonian forces.
 Brotherhood of Blackheads formed.
 1347 – Reval ( & Esthonia) sold to Teutonic Order by Valdemar III of Denmark.
 1360 - Town "fortified."
 1370 – Pikk Hermann tower built.
 1372
 School built on Pikk Street.
 Population: 3,250.
 1404 – Town Hall construction completed.
 1410 – Great Guild Hall built.
 1422 – Raeapteek pharmacy in business.
 1433 – Fire.
 1436 – St. Bridget's Convent built.
 1441 – Christmas tree display in Town Hall Square begins.
 1464 - Plague.
 1475 – The artillery tower Kiek in de Kök built.
 1514 - December: Christmas tree displayed in marketplace.
 1530
 Fat Margaret tower built.
 Old Thomas weathervane installed atop Town Hall.
 1532 – Plague.
 1561
 Reval becomes a dominion of Sweden.
 St. Mary's Cathedral, Tallinn changes from Roman Catholic to Lutheran.
 1569 – Reval besieged by Danes.
 1570 – Reval besieged by Russians.
 1577 – Reval again besieged by Russians.

17th century
 1630 – Reval Gymnasium (school) established.
 1633 - Gymnasiums printing house is founded.
 1638 - Beginning of regular post between Tallinn and other Swedish cities.
 1675 - First newspaper in Tallinn, Revalsche Post-Zeitung, starts operating.
 1684 - Devastating fire in Toompea.

18th century
 1710 – Peter the Great's army besieges Reval, Reval surrenders (Siege of Reval (1710)), and Russian rule begins.
 1719 – Catherinethal Palace (Kadriorg Palace) built by Peter the Great.
 1725 - Toompea orphanage is founded.
 1726 - Naval Blockade of Reval (1726)
 1758 - City is released for the task to hold up the defence facilities.
 1765 - Domeschool is changed to Academic Knightschool. Domechurch loses its control over the school and it is given to Estonian Knighthood.
 1769- Mihkli church-monastery is reconstructed as an orthodox church.
 1772
 Toompea Castle rebuilt.
 Population: 6,954.
 Cemeteries are taken outside of city walls.
 1774 – Kopli cemetery and Mõigu cemetery established.
 1782 - Population: 10,653
 1784 - First theatre is founded by August von Kotzebue.
 1795 - The Tallinna saksa teater is founded.

19th century

 1801 - British navy under the command of admiral Nelson is on the Bay of Tallinn, but he doesn´t attack.
 1816 – Population: 12,000.
 1817 - Tallinn´s customs affair
 1820 - Oleviste Church´s tower burns down.
 1831 - Cholera strikes Tallinn (758 victims)
 1843 - The renovation of city's canalisation begins. It is finished by the year 1860.
 1844 – St. Peter and St. Paul's Cathedral, Tallinn completed.
 1848
 Estonian Knighthood House rebuilt.
 Cholera attack again (1029 victims)
 1851 – Population: 24,000.
 1857
 Tallinn is removed from the list of fortress citys, which marks the beginning of Tallinns rapid expansion and becoming a metropol.
 First baltic singing festival takes place in Tallinn.
 1860 - First edition of the Revalsche Zeitung published
 1864 – Kanut Guild Hall built.
 1865 - The Gas factory of Tallinn is finished.
 1867 – St. John's Church built.
 1870
 Railway begins operating.
 Baltic Station (Tallinn Railway station, Balti jaam) built.
 1880 - June: Estonian Song Festival held in city.
 1881 - The construction of a modern canalisation begins.
 1883
 Tallinn City Archives open.
 Great Synagogue of Tallinn founded.
 1886 – Glehn Castle built.
 1888 – Horse-drawn tram begins operating.
 1889 - Toompea is finally administratively united with Reval.
 1896 – Estonian Song Festival relocates to Reval.
 1900
 Nevsky Cathedral completed.
 Population: 66,292.

20th century

1900s-1940s
 1901 - First Estonian newspaper Teataja begins circulation.
 1902 - Russalka Memorial erected.
 1903 - Rahumäe cemetery established.
 1905 - January: Labour strike.
 1906 - Estonia theatre group active.
 1910 - German Theatre built.
 1913
 Power Plant begins operating.
 Bekker Port and Estonia Theatre open.
 1914 - Industrial Art School founded.
 1916 - Defence Forces Cemetery established.
 1917
 March: Labor strike.
 November: Bolsheviks in power.
Reval renamed "Tallinn" (approximate date).
 Nõmme gained borough rights.
 Population: 160,000.
 1918
 February: Germans in power.
 National Library of Estonia established.
 Tallinn College of Engineering and Higher Music School established.
 1919 - Art Museum of Estonia established.
 1921 - Tallinn French School founded.
 1923
 Pääsküla-Tallinn electric railway begins operating.
 Hiiu Stadium built.
 Järve train station opens.
 1924
 Tallinn Jewish School established.
 Elektriraudtee begins operating.
 November 3 – Kivimäe train station opens.
 1925
 Narva Road tram begins operating.
 Chamber of Commerce founded.
 1926
 Estonian Radio Symphony Orchestra active.
 Kadriorg Stadium built.
 Nõmme gained town rights.
 Hiiu train station opens.
 1928 - Lilleküla train station opens.
 1932 - Laagri train station opens.
 1933 - Pirita-Kose-Kloostrimetsa Circuit opens.
 1935 - Estonian Maritime Museum founded.
 1936
 Tallinn Airport opens.
 Tallinn Technical Institute active.
 1937 - French Lyceum built.
 1938 - Kopli freight station opens.
 1939 - Tallinn Zoo founded.
 1940 - July 29: Town of Nõmme merged to Tallinn.
 1941 - August: Germans in power.
 1942 - Bombing by Soviets.
 1943
 Bombing by Soviets.
 March 24: Bungsberg (ship) sunk.
 1944 - Bombing by Soviets.
 1945 - Tallinna Autobussikoondis founded.
 1946 - Institute of Theology of Estonian Evangelical Lutheran Church established.
 1947 - Monument to the Liberators of Tallinn unveiled.

1950s-1990s
 1952 - Tallinn Pedagogical Institute established.
 1955 - July: Television begins broadcasting.
 1956 - Kalevi Keskstaadion built.
 1959
 Tallinn Song Stage built.
 Bus Station moved to its current location from the Stalin Square (Viru Square).
Population: 283,071.
 1960 - July 21: Tallinna Kaubamaja (department store) opened.
 1961
December 1 – Tallinn Botanic Garden established.
 Development of Õismäe area begins.
 Tallinn Music High School founded.
 1962 - Kalevi Spordihall built.
 1964 - Kalamaja cemetery destroyed.
 1965
July 6 – Trolleybuses begin operating.
 Helsinki-Tallinn ferry resumes operation.
 New Bus Station built.
 1966 - August 2: Tallinn Old Town conservation area established.
 1969 - Pirita Velodrome opens.
 1972 - May 5: Viru Hotel opens.
 1975 - Population: 299,000.
 1977 - Development of Lasnamäe area begins.
 1980
 MS Georg Ots begins operating.
 Linnahall, TV Tower and Post Office built.
 April 6 – Hotel Olümpia opens.
 1986 - Muuga Harbour opens.
 1987
 Singing demonstrations against Soviet occupation begin.
 Estonian History Museum inaugurated.
 1988 - Estonian Business School established.
 1989
 Estonian Film Archives active.
 Population: 478,974.
 1990 - Estonian School of Diplomacy established.
 1991
Estoniya newspaper begins publication.
 Estonian Maritime Academy and University Nord founded.
 1992
 Port authority established.
 Estonian Academy of Security Sciences, International University Audentes, Mainor Business School, and Tallinn University of Applied Sciences established.
 1993 - Concordia International University Estonia established.
 1997
 Tammsaare tee extended to the interchange of Pärnu maantee and Järvevana tee.
 Tallinn Black Nights Film Festival begins.
 Euro University established.
 1998 - Rocca al Mare Shopping Centre opens.
 1999
 Meriton Grand Hotel opens.
 May 28 – Kristiine shopping centre opens.
 2000 – Estonian Information Technology College established.

21st century

 2001
 A. Le Coq Arena (Lilleküla Stadium) and Saku Suurhall Arena open.
 February 1 – Radisson SAS Hotel opens.
 2003
 Kultuuritehas Polymer active.
 Museum of Occupations opens.
 2004
 Viru Center with bus terminal opens.
 Ülemiste Center opens.
 2005
 Tallinn University and Baltic Film and Media School established.
 Theatre NO99 active.
 2006 - Kumu Art Museum built.
 2007
 April: Bronze Night unrest.
 December 10 – Swissôtel Tallinn opens.
 Tallinn Synagogue built.
 2008
 NATO Cooperative Cyber Defence Centre built.
 November 10 – Kitseküla train station opens.
 2009
 Väo Power Plant begins operating.
 War of Independence Victory Column unveiled.
 October 6 – Nokia Concert Hall opens.
 October 9 – Solaris Center opens.
 2010 - 23rd European Film Awards held.
 2011
 Tallinna TV begins broadcasting.
 City designated a European Capital of Culture
 2015 - Population: 439,286.
 2017 - Tram line 4 extended to the airport.
 2019 - Opening of Reidi tee between Kadriorg and the Old Port.

See also
 List of mayors of Tallinn
 History of Tallinn
 Other names of Tallinn
 Timeline of Estonian history

References

This article incorporates information from the Estonian Wikipedia.

Bibliography

External links

 Europeana. Items related to Tallinn, various dates.

 
Tallinn
Tallinn-related lists
Estonia history-related lists
Years in Estonia
Tallinn